The 1991 Davis Cup (also known as the 1991 Davis Cup by NEC for sponsorship purposes) was the 80th edition of the Davis Cup, the most important tournament between national teams in men's tennis. 88 teams would enter the competition, 16 in the World Group, 20 in the Americas Zone, 20 in the Asia/Oceania Zone, and 32 in the Europe/Africa Zone. Congo, the Eastern Caribbean, El Salvador and Saudi Arabia made their first appearances in the tournament.

This year's tournament saw the Germany Davis Cup team representing all parts of Germany for the first time since 1939, following the reunification of West and East Germany into a single German state in October 1990. The breakup of Yugoslavia during the tournament also resulted in impacts for the Yugoslavia Davis Cup team, after high-profile Croatian players Goran Ivanišević and Goran Prpić withdrew from the Yugoslav team following Croatia's declaration of independence in June 1991.

France defeated the United States in the final, held at the Palais des Sports de Gerland in Lyon, France, on 29 November–1 December, to win their first title since 1932 and their 7th title overall.

World Group

Draw

Final
France vs. United States

World Group Qualifying Round

Date: 20–22 September

The eight losing teams in the World Group first round ties and eight winners of the Zonal Group I final round ties competed in the World Group Qualifying Round for spots in the 1992 World Group.

Americas Zone

Group I

  and  advance to World Group Qualifying Round.
  relegated to Group II in 1992.

Group II

  promoted to Group I in 1992.

Asia/Oceania Zone

Group I

  relegated to Group II in 1992.

  and  advance to World Group Qualifying Round.

Group II

  promoted to Group I in 1992.

Europe/Africa Zone

Group I

Group II Europe

  promoted to Group I in 1992.

Group II Africa

  promoted to Group I in 1992.

References
General

Specific

External links
Davis Cup Official Website

 
Davis Cups by year
Davis Cup
Davis Cup